Anolis trinitatis, also known as Saint Vincent bush anole, Saint Vincent's bush anole, or the Trinidad anole, is a species of anole lizard found in the Caribbean.

Geographic range
It is endemic to the island of Saint Vincent, and has been introduced to Trinidad.

Description
Males, which reach 74 mm snout-to-vent (about 3 inches), are green to green-blue, with blue stippling on the head and anterior trunk. They have yellow coloring on the jaws and ventral surface, and the area around the eye is dark. Males have a large dewlap that extends into the abdominal region. Females are duller and have a smaller dewlap.

Behavior
It typically perches at low heights, below around 3 m (10 feet).

References

.

Anoles
Lizards of the Caribbean
Endemic fauna of Saint Vincent and the Grenadines
Reptiles of Trinidad and Tobago
Taxa named by Christian Frederik Lütken
Taxa named by Johannes Theodor Reinhardt
Reptiles described in 1862